Sir John Brigg DL (21 September 1834 – 30 September 1911), was a British Liberal Party politician.

Background
He was the second son of John Brigg from Keighley and Margaret Ann Marriner from Greengate. He married in 1860, Mary Anderton from Bingley. They had four sons and one daughter.

Political career
He was Liberal MP for the Keighley Division of the West Riding of Yorkshire, from 1895 to his death in 1911. He was a Justice of the Peace, and was appointed a Deputy Lieutenant of the West Riding of Yorkshire and of the City and County of the city of York on 19 June 1902. He was an Alderman on Yorkshire County Council. He was Knighted in 1909.

Business career
He was actively engaged in Worsted business until 1890, being Chairman of John Brigg & Company Ltd., worsted-spinners and manufacturers of Calversyke Mill, Keighley. He was a Director of Leeds and Liverpool Canal Company. He was a Director of William Ramsden & Company Ltd. He was a Director and Vice-Chairman of Bradford Old Bank. He was on the Advisory Board of United Counties Bank.

Educational interest
He was a Governor of Skipton and Giggleswick Grammar Schools. He helped to found Keighley Trade School and reorganise Girls’ Grammar School. He was a Governor of Skipton and Keighley Girls Grammar Schools. He was a Life Governor and Council Member of Yorkshire College.

Death
Brigg died on 30 September 1911, aged 77.

Sources
Who Was Who; http://www.ukwhoswho.com
British parliamentary election results 1885–1918, Craig, F. W. S.

References

External links
 
 

1834 births
1911 deaths
Liberal Party (UK) MPs for English constituencies
UK MPs 1895–1900
UK MPs 1900–1906
UK MPs 1906–1910
UK MPs 1910
UK MPs 1910–1918
Councillors in Yorkshire and the Humber
People from Keighley
British textile industry businesspeople
19th-century English businesspeople